Tagetes laxa is a South American species of marigolds in the family Asteraceae. It is native to Bolivia and northern Argentina (Jujuy, Salta, Tucumán).

References

External links

laxa
Flora of Bolivia
Flora of Argentina
Plants described in 1937
Taxa named by Ángel Lulio Cabrera